This article lists political parties in the country of Georgia.

Georgia has a multi-party system.

Parliamentary parties

Extraparliamentary parties

Defunct parties

See also
 List of political parties in Abkhazia
 List of political parties in South Ossetia
 Lists of political parties

References

Georgia
 
Political parties
Political parties
Georgia
Georgia